Colona is a genus of flowering plant in the Malvaceae sensu lato or Tiliaceae: now placed in the subfamily Grewioideae.  It is found in south-east Asia.

Species
Plants of the World Online lists:
 Colona aequilateralis (C.T.White & W.D.Francis) Merr. & L.M.Perry
 Colona angusta (Pierre) Burret
 Colona archboldiana Merr. & L.M.Perry
 Colona auriculata (Desf.) Craib
 Colona blancoi (Rolfe) Merr.
 Colona borneensis (Merr.) Burret
 Colona celebica (Blume) Burret
 Colona discolor Merr. & L.M.Perry
 Colona elobata Craib
 Colona evecta (Pierre) Burret
 Colona evrardii Gagnep.
 Colona flagrocarpa (C.B.Clarke) Craib
 Colona floribunda (Kurz) Craib
 Colona grandiflora Kosterm.
 Colona hamannii Riedl & Riedl-Dorn
 Colona hirsuta (Warb.) Burret
 Colona isodiametrica Burret
 Colona jagori (Warb.) Burret
 Colona javanica (Blume) Burret
 Colona kodap Gagnep.
 Colona kostermansiana Wirawan
 Colona lanceolata (Warb.) Burret
 Colona longipetiolata Merr.
 Colona megacarpa (Merr.) Burret
 Colona merguensis (Planch. ex Mast.) Burret
 Colona mollis (Warb.) Burret
 Colona nubla Gagnep.
 Colona philippinensis (S.Vidal) Burret
 Colona poilanei Gagnep.
 Colona scabra (Sm.) Burret
 Colona serratifolia Cav.
 Colona subaequalis (Planch. ex S.Vidal) Burret
 Colona thorelii (Gagnep.) Burret
 Colona velutina Merr. & L.M.Perry
 Colona velutinosa Kosterm.
 Colona winitii (Craib) Craib

References

External links

Grewioideae
Malvaceae genera
Flora of Indo-China
Flora of Malesia
Taxa named by Antonio José Cavanilles